Susan Street may refer to:

Susan Street (civil servant)
Susan Street (dancer), see Australian Dance Awards
Susan Street, protagonist in Ambition (Julie Birchill novel)